Manara Manasi is a 2018 Odia language action film directed by Sachidananda Samal written by Tusharkanta Pattanayak. Starring Vivash and Sonali in the lead roles.

Cast
 Vivash
 Sonali
 Ajit Das
 Kuni Mishra
 Pragya Ranjan

Soundtrack

Music composed by Sushil Dalai. The soundtrack was released by Cine 24.

References

External links 
 
  on Movie buff

2018 films